CJ Hamilton may refer to:

 Lord Claud Hamilton (1843–1925), Claud John Hamilton
 CJ Hamilton (footballer) (born 1995), English footballer
 C. J. Hamilton (author) (1841–1935), English author